KAPUTU, formerly known as Embrace and NEW:NAME, is a Danish sister duo consisting of Anilde and Azilda Kaputu. They became the winners of the ninth season of the Danish version of the X Factor. They received 60% of the public vote and became the second group to win the competition. After they won their winning single Commitment Issues was released on the Music Services. On 21 April, they changed their band name to NEW:NAME. On 20 May they released their debut EP called True Story.

Performances during X Factor

Discography

Singles
 "Commitment Issues" (2016)
 "Don’t You Wait" (2016)
 "Hvor du går" (2017)
 "Better Off" (2020)

EPs
 True Story (2016)

References

External links

Musical groups established in 2016
Danish musical duos
2016 establishments in Denmark
Sibling musical duos